Machilipatnam (Assembly constituency) is a constituency in Krishna district of Andhra Pradesh, representing the state legislative assembly in India. It is one of the seven assembly segments of Machilipatnam (Lok Sabha constituency), along with Gannavaram, Gudivada, Pedana, Avanigadda, Pamarru SC and Penamaluru.  
Perni Venkataramaiah is the present MLA of the constituency, who won the 2019 Andhra Pradesh Legislative Assembly election from Yuvajana Sramika Rythu Congress Party. , there are a total of 184,506 electors in the constituency.

Mandals 

Machilipatnam mandal is the only mandal that forms the assembly constituency.

Members of Legislative Assembly

Election Results

Assembly Elections 2009

See also 
 List of constituencies of the Andhra Pradesh Legislative Assembly

References 

Assembly constituencies of Andhra Pradesh